The 2022 Winton SuperSprint (know for commercial purpose as the 2022 Pizza Hut Winton SuperSprint) was a motor racing event held as a part of the 2022 Supercars Championship from Saturday 21 May to Sunday 22 May 2022. The event was held at the Winton Motor Raceway in Benalla, Victoria. It was the fifth round of the 2022 Supercars Championship and consisted of three races of 108.000 kilometres each.

Results

Race 1

Race 2

Race 3

Championship standings after the race

Drivers' Championship standings

Teams'' Championship standings

 Note: Only the top five positions are included for standings.

References

Winton SuperSprint
Winton SuperSprint